Manjushree Thapa (born 1968 in Kathmandu) is a Nepalese–born Canadian essayist, fiction writer, translator and editor. She is one of the first English writer of Nepali descent to be published internationally. Forget Kathmandu and The Tutor of History are some of her most well known works.

Biography
Manjushree Thapa was born on 1968. She grew up in Nepal, Canada and in United States. She began to write upon completing her BFA in photography at the Rhode Island School of Design. Her first book was Mustang Bhot in Fragments (1992). In 2001 she published the novel The Tutor of History, which she had begun as her MFA thesis in the creative writing program at the University of Washington in Seattle, which she attended as a Fulbright scholar. Her best known book is Forget Kathmandu: An Elegy for Democracy (2005), published just weeks before the royal coup in Nepal on 1 February 2005. The book was shortlisted for the Lettre Ulysses Award in 2006.

After the publication of the book, Manjushree Thapa left the country to write against the coup. In 2007 she published a short story collection, Tilled Earth. In 2009 she published a biography of a Nepali environmentalist: A Boy from Siklis: The Life and Times of Chandra Gurung. The following year she published a novel, Seasons of Flight. In 2011 she published a nonfiction collection, The Lives We Have Lost: Essays and Opinions on Nepal. Her latest book, published in South Asia in 2016, is a novel, All Of Us in Our Own Lives. She has also contributed op-eds to the New York Times. Her translation of Indra Bahadur Rai's There's a Carnival Today won 2017 PEN America Heim Translation Grant.

Bibliography
Fiction
 The Tutor of History (2001)
 Tilled Earth (2007)
 Seasons of Flight (2010)
 All Of Us in Our Own Lives (2016)

Non-Fiction
 Mustang Bhot in Fragments (1992)
 Forget Kathmandu: An Elegy for Democracy (2005)
  A Boy from Siklis (2009)
  The Lives We Have Lost (2012)

Translation
 A Leaf in a Begging Bowl by Ramesh Vikal (2000)
 The Country is Yours (2009)
 There's a Carnival Today by Indra Bahadur Rai (2017)

See also

 Nepali literature
 Canadian literature
 List of Nepali translators

References

External links
 Manjushree Thapa's website.
 http://www.bookslut.com/features/2014_10_020904.php

1968 births
Living people
Canadian people of Nepalese descent
People from Kathmandu
University of Washington alumni
Canadian women essayists
Canadian women novelists
Canadian women short story writers
21st-century Canadian novelists
21st-century Canadian short story writers
Nepalese emigrants to Canada
Nepalese women novelists
Nepalese translators
Canadian non-fiction writers
Canadian translators
Translators to Nepali
Translators to English
Translators from English 
Translators from Nepali 
20th-century Nepalese writers
20th-century Nepalese women writers
21st-century Nepalese writers
21st-century Nepalese women writers
20th-century Canadian women writers
21st-century Canadian women writers
20th-century Canadian short story writers
Canadian women non-fiction writers
20th-century Canadian essayists
21st-century Canadian essayists
English-language writers from Nepal